Robert Lamont Belknap (December 23, 1929 – March 17, 2014) was an American scholar of Russian literature. He was a professor at Columbia University, where he served as interim dean of Columbia College, and director of the Harriman Institute. He received a Guggenheim Fellowship in 1994.

Biography 
Belknap was born in New York City on December 23, 1929 to lawyer Chauncey Belknap and his wife Dorothy Lamont, daughter of United States Secretary of Commerce and head of the American Iron and Steel Institute Robert P. Lamont. He was educated at the Buckley School, Philips Exeter Academy, and graduated from Princeton University in 1951. At Princeton, he roomed with Allen Dulles and was a member of the Quadrangle Club. He received his M.A. from the School of International and Public Affairs, Columbia University and Ph.D. from Columbia University following army service. He also studied at the University of Paris and the University of Leningrad.

Belknap began teaching at Columbia in 1956, and served as interim dean in 1975, and director of the Harriman Institute from 1977 to 1980. A scholar of Russian literature, he specialized in the works of Fyodor Dostoevsky, notably on The Brothers Karamazov. His work is considered as one of the best studies on Dostoevsky produced by the present generation of scholars. 

Belknap served as chairman of the board of the Brearley School.

Belknap was married to historian and academic Cynthia Whittaker. He was a longtime resident of Wilton, Connecticut, and Cliff Island, Maine. He died on March 17, 2014, in New York City.

References 

1929 births
2014 deaths

Columbia University faculty
Princeton University alumni
School of International and Public Affairs, Columbia University alumni
Columbia Graduate School of Arts and Sciences alumni
University of Paris alumni
Saint Petersburg State University alumni
Buckley School (New York City) alumni
Phillips Exeter Academy alumni